The Diocese of Paranavaí is a Latin Church ecclesiastical territory or diocese of the Catholic Church in Brazil. It is a suffragan diocese in the ecclesiastical province of the metropolitan Archdiocese of Maringá in Paraná.

Its cathedral  is Catedral Maria Mãe da Igreja, dedicated to Mary Mother of the Church, in the episcopal see of Paranavaí. The Bishop of Paranavaí has been Mário Spaki since 2018.

History 
 20 January 1968: Established as Diocese of Paranavaí, on territory split off from the then Diocese of Maringá (now its Metropolitan) under the Bishop Jaime Luiz Coelho.

Statistics 
, it pastorally served 228,000 Catholics (85.4% of 267,000 total) on 8,699 km² in 35 parishes and 1 mission with 41 priests (34 diocesan, 7 religious), 64 lay religious (21 brothers, 43 sisters) and 4 seminarians.

Episcopal ordinaries and coadjutor bishop
Suffragan Bishops of Paranavaí 
 Benjamin de Souza Gomes (11 March 1968 - retired 12 October 1985), died 1995
 Rubens Augusto de Souza Espínola (12 October 1985 - retired 3 December 2003) previously Titular Bishop of Bilta (1980.12.20 – 1985.10.12) as Auxiliary Bishop of Diocese of São Luís de Montes Belos (Brazil) (1980.12.20 – 1985.10.12), died 2017
 Coadjutor Bishop: Elizeu de Morais Pimentel (2001.12.19 – death 2003.02.27)
 Sérgio Aparecido Colombo (3 December 2003 – 16 September 2009), appointed Bishop of Bragança Paulista, São Paulo
 Geremias Steinmetz (5 January 2011 - 14 June 2017), appointed Archbishop of Londrina, Parana
 Mário Spaki (25 April 2018 – present)

See also 
 List of Catholic dioceses in Brazil

Sources and external links 
 GCatholic.org - data for al sections
 Catholic Hierarchy
 Diocese website (Portuguese)

Roman Catholic dioceses in Brazil
Roman Catholic Ecclesiastical Province of Maringá
Paranavaí
Religious organizations established in 1968
Roman Catholic dioceses and prelatures established in the 20th century